E. flavum may refer to:
 Eriogonum flavum, the alpine golden buckwheat, a plant species native to northwestern North America
 Etheostoma flavum, the saffron darter, a fish species found in Tennessee
 Edaphobaculum flavum a bacterial species from the genus of Edaphobaculum

See also 
 Flavum